Hard Asphalt is a 1986 Norwegian drama film directed by Sølve Skagen. It was entered into the 15th Moscow International Film Festival. The film was selected as the Norwegian entry for the Best Foreign Language Film at the 59th Academy Awards, but was not accepted as a nominee.

Cast
Kristin Kajander as Ida
Frank Krog as Knut 
Marianne Nielsen as Åse 
Morten Faldaas as Bønna 
Liv Heløe as May-Britt 
Tone Schwarzott as Idas mor 
Tom Tellefsen as Idas far 
Svein Erik Brodal as Herr Abrahamsen 
Gudrun Waadeland as Fru Abrahamsen 
Sigve Bøe as Nordlie 
Anne Marit Jacobsen as Dagmamma 
Bernhard Ramstad as Kaspersen

See also
 List of submissions to the 59th Academy Awards for Best Foreign Language Film
 List of Norwegian submissions for the Academy Award for Best Foreign Language Film

References

External links
 

1986 films
1986 drama films
1980s Norwegian-language films
Norwegian drama films